William Bertram (28 March 1883 – 31 May 1959) was a Cape Colony cricketer. He played in two first-class matches for Border in 1902/03.

See also
 List of Border representative cricketers

References

External links
 

1883 births
1959 deaths
Cricketers from Cape Colony
Border cricketers